The Municipality of Dobrna is a municipality in Slovenia. It is best known for the spa town of Dobrna, which is also the seat of the municipality. It lies north of Celje and east of Velenje in an area that is part of the traditional region of Styria. The municipality is now included in the Savinja Statistical Region.

Settlements
In addition to the municipal seat of Dobrna, the municipality also includes the following settlements:

 Brdce nad Dobrno
 Klanc
 Loka pri Dobrni
 Lokovina
 Parož
 Pristova
 Strmec nad Dobrno
 Vinska Gorica
 Vrba
 Zavrh nad Dobrno

References

External links

 Municipality of Dobrna on Geopedia
 Municipality of Dobrna website

Dobrna